Erik Westzynthius the Younger (1743–1787) was a Finnish church painter.

Westzynthius was born in Oulu. His father Erik Westzynthius the Elder was also a painter. He studied painting with Johan Backman and Emanuel Granberg. His only known work is several wall and ceiling paintings between 1779 and 1782 for the Oulainen church.

References

 Rajaniemi, Marja-Liisa, Oulaisten picture church, reconstructed images: Ari Häyrinen. Publ. Oulaisten church, 2003

1743 births
1787 deaths
People from Oulu
18th-century Finnish painters
18th-century male artists
Finnish male painters